The 2002 Rally GB (formally the 58th Network Q Rally of Great Britain) was the fourteenth and final round of the 2002 World Rally Championship. The race was held over four days between 14 November and 17 November 2002, and was won by Subaru's Petter Solberg, his 1st win in the World Rally Championship.

Background

Entry list

Itinerary
All dates and times are GMT (UTC±0).

Results

Overall

World Rally Cars

Classification

Special stages

Championship standings
Bold text indicates 2002 World Champions.

Junior World Rally Championship

Classification

Special stages

Championship standings
Bold text indicates 2002 World Champions.

References

External links 
 Official website of the World Rally Championship

Rally GB
2002 Rally GB
Rally GB